Little Brazil, Manhattan refers to a small neighborhood in Manhattan, New York City that is centered on the single block of West 46th Street between Fifth and Sixth Avenues. In the 1960s, the street was home to dozens of Brazilian commercial enterprises and Brazilian restaurants, although only a handful remain in the 2000s. It is demarcated by signs between Fifth Avenue and Seventh Avenue, along 46th Street, and several vendors display the green and yellow colors of the Brazilian flag.

Little Brazil is famous for hosting New York City's annual Brazilian Day which features live music and food stands from the various restaurants on the street.

References

 Not for Tourists map
 Description and pictures of Little Brazil, New York

Brazilian-American culture in New York (state)
Brazilian-American history
Brazilian communities
Cultural history of Brazil
Ethnic enclaves in New York (state)
Midtown Manhattan
Neighborhoods in Manhattan
Restaurant districts and streets in the United States